Melamchi Water Supply Project (MWSP) is a project to supply drinking water to Kathmandu Valley by diverting  of water per day. The project started in 1998 and completed in 2021. The intake of this project is located in Melamchi, Nepal. Ministry of Physical Infrastructure and Transport (Nepal) is the executing agency for the Project and Melamchi Water Supply Development Board is the implementing agency.

This project was mainly financed by Japan and the Asian Development Bank. About 57% of the project cost was loan, 16% was grant and 26% was financed by the Nepalese government.

Project description
The intake of the project lies in the Melamchi valley in the gorge below Ghwakan, just upstream of the confluence of Melamchi River and Ribarma Khola. The main structure is the diversion weir, river-training structures, and sediment exclusion basin. A gravity concrete weir is 5 to 7 m high with the crest at an elevation of 1,425 m asl. The control system and the sediment exclusion basin have a design capacity of 6m3/s. The sediment exclusion basins are double-chambered with a length of 80 m each.

The tunnel intake is at an elevation of about 1416m and the outlet is about 1,408 m asl.
The length of the tunnel from the intake to the water purification facilities in Kathmandu Valley at Sundarijal is about 26 km. The tunnel is longest water supply tunnel of South-asia and second longest water supply tunnel of Asia. The tunnel is being excavated from adits at Ambathan, Gyalthum, Sindhu and Sundarijal waterfall. The diversion flow in 6m3/s. The tunnel has a cross-sectional area of 12.7 m2 and lined with shotcrete in most of the section; concrete lining is done only in the weak rock formation. The tunnel is excavated by drill and blast method. The geology of the areas consists mainly of gneiss with mica schist and laminated quartzite.

The distribution work has nine service reservoirs at various locations in the Kathmandu (Mahankalchaur, Bansbari, Paani Pokhari, Balaju, Khumaltar, Arubari, Tigni, Katunje and Kritipur). The water from Sundarijal to service reservoir is supplied by a Bulk Distribution System (BDS). The distribution to household is done by a network of pipes about  670 km long. About 540 km of sewerage network will also be upgraded in this project.

Delays
The project had a serious history of delays.
In 2007 August, the ministry of physical planning, Hislia Yami, cancelled the contract awarded to UK company Severn Trent clamining that Severn Trent did not have a sufficiently strong international track record.
In September 2012, the contract with China Railway 15 Bureau Group Corporation was terminated.
In 2018, the deadline was extended to mid-February 2019 with CMC, the contractor.
In 2019, the contract with Cooperativa Muratori e Cementisti di Ravenna (CMC) was terminated over payment dispute.

Accidents
2020-July 14: During testing of the tunnel, the breaking of bulkhead gate caused flooding in the tunnel resulting in the death of two staff.
2021-June 15: Due to monsoon flood, the headworks of the project at Ambathan area was blocked by flood. Temporary structures such as construction camps and Bailey bridges swept away. Eight workers including three Chinese, three Indians and two Nepalis were washed away by the flood.

Corruption
 In 2005, Prime Minister Sher Bahadur Deuba was charged for corruption by the Royal Corruption Control Commission. The case was terminated by the Supreme Court considering it as an unconstitutional move by King Gyanendra.
In 2006, Sweden withdrew its funding of this project over corruption issues.
 In 2019, the contractor Cooperativa Muratori e Cementisti di Ravenna (CMC) alleged two senior Nepali bureaucrats Gajendra Kumar Thakur, a former secretary at the Water Supply Ministry, and Surya Raj Kadel, executive director of the Melamchi Water Supply Development Board for a cut of 3% of payment on NPR 300 million payment. This issue lead CMC to break the contract with the government.

References

External links

Official website
KUKL

Water supply infrastructure in Nepal
National Pride Projects
2021 establishments in Nepal